Rafael Pyrasch (born 6 August 1986) is a German international rugby union player, playing for the Heidelberger RK in the Rugby-Bundesliga and the German national rugby union team.

Pyrasch played in the 2011-2015 German championship final for Heidelberger RK, which the club won.

He made his debut for Germany against Switzerland in a friendly on 29 September 2007.

His club, DSV 78/08 Ricklingen, won the 2nd Bundesliga title in 2008-2009 and earned promotion to the Rugby-Bundesliga, now playing as DSV 78 Hannover.

Pyrasch has also played for the Germany's 7's side in the past, like at the 2009 Hannover Sevens and the 2009 London Sevens World Series.

Pyrasch (Staff Sergeant) got contracted by the German Army (Bundeswehr) 2010 to become a professional player in the Sports- Company to play Rugby 7s for Germany and to representing the German Army.

Honours

Club
 German rugby union championship
Champions: 2011-2015 15s / 7s
Team of the Year 2011 HRK 
North-sea Cup 2012 Winners
EPCR Cup Winners 2018
 German rugby union cup
 Winners: 2011

Stats
Rafael Pyrasch's personal statistics in club and international rugby:

Club

 As of 11 May 2012

National team

European Nations Cup

Friendlies and other competitions

 As of 28 April 2013

References

External links
 Raphael Pyrasch at scrum.com
   Raphael Pyrasch at totalrugby.de
  Raphael Pyrasch at the DRV website

1986 births
Living people
German rugby union players
Germany international rugby union players
DSV 78 Hannover players
Heidelberger RK players
Rugby union wings